Sun Le (Chinese: 孙乐; Pinyin: Sūn Lè; born 17 September 1989 in Shijiazhuang) is a Chinese football player who currently plays for China League One side Suzhou Dongwu as a goalkeeper.

Club career
Sun started his football career in 2008 when he played in his hometown club Shijiazhuang Tiangong in the China League Two. After Shijiazhuang Tiangong dissolved in 2009, he was linked with Dalian Aerbin and Shanghai Shenhua. Sun chose to join China League One club Shanghai East Asia in early 2010. He played as a second choice goalkeeper in Shanghai. Sun made 7 league appearances in the 2012 season, as Shanghai East Asia won the champions and promoted to the top flight.

Career statistics 
Statistics accurate as of match played 8 December 2022.

Honours

Club
Shanghai SIPG
Chinese Super League: 2018
China League One: 2012

References

External links
 

1989 births
Living people
Chinese footballers
Sportspeople from Shijiazhuang
Footballers from Hebei
Shanghai Port F.C. players
Chinese Super League players
China League One players
China League Two players
Association football goalkeepers